Dana Elvira Cervantes García (born 18 August 1978 in Málaga) is a former Spanish athlete specializing in the pole vault. She competed at the 2004 Olympic Games in Athens failing to get a valid jump in the final.

Her outdoor personal best is 4.40 metres achieved in 2004 while her indoor best is 4.46 metres from the same year.

Competition record

References

External links

1978 births
Living people
Spanish female pole vaulters
Athletes (track and field) at the 2004 Summer Olympics
Olympic athletes of Spain
Sportspeople from Málaga
Universiade medalists in athletics (track and field)
Mediterranean Games gold medalists for Spain
Mediterranean Games medalists in athletics
Athletes (track and field) at the 2001 Mediterranean Games
Athletes (track and field) at the 2005 Mediterranean Games
Universiade bronze medalists for Spain
Medalists at the 1999 Summer Universiade
Competitors at the 2005 Summer Universiade